Thomas Osbert Mordaunt (1730–1809) was a British officer and poet, known for "The Call".

Mordaunt was the son of Charles Mordaunt, also a soldier. His grandfather, Brigadier-General Lewis Mordaunt, was the younger brother of Charles Mordaunt, 3rd Earl of Peterborough, sometime First Lord of the Treasury. He was commissioned ensign and lieutenant in the 2nd Regiment of Foot Guards on 27 January 1753, and promoted captain-lieutenant in the 10th Regiment of Dragoons on 25 December 1755. He is recorded as having ultimately achieved the rank of major general.

Mordaunt is best remembered for his oft-quoted poem "The Call", written during the Seven Years' War of 1756–1763:

 "Sound, sound the clarion, fill the fife!
 Throughout the sensual world proclaim,
 One crowded hour of glorious life
 Is worth an age without a name."

For many years, the poem was incorrectly attributed to Mordaunt's contemporary, Sir Walter Scott. Scott had merely quoted a stanza of the poem at the beginning of Chapter 34 (Chapter XIII of Volume II) of his novel Old Mortality.

One Crowded Hour, Tim Bowden's biography of Australian combat cameraman Neil Davis, takes its title from a phrase used in "The Call". Arthur Conan Doyle's short story, One Crowded Hour, makes ironic use of the same phrase.

References

External links
 Expanded biography at Mordaunt Family History website
 Full text of "The Call"

1730 births
1809 deaths
British poets
Fellows of the Royal Society
British male poets
Coldstream Guards officers
10th Royal Hussars officers
British Army personnel of the Seven Years' War
British Army generals